Pitcairnia harlingii is a species of flowering plant in the family Bromeliaceae, endemic to Ecuador. It was first described by Lyman Bradford Smith in 1961. Its natural habitats are subtropical or tropical moist lowland forests and subtropical or tropical moist montane forests. It is threatened by habitat loss.

References

Flora of Ecuador
harlingii
Vulnerable plants
Plants described in 1961
Taxonomy articles created by Polbot